The France's 1966–1970 nuclear test series was a group of 22 nuclear tests conducted in 1966–1970. These tests followed the In Ekker series and preceded the 1971–1974 French nuclear tests series.

References

1966 in France
1967 in France
1968 in France
1969 in France
1970 in France
French nuclear weapons testing